Plato Island is a small island lying  east of Darwin Island in the Danger Islands off the Antarctic Peninsula. The descriptive name Islote Plato (plate island) was given by the Argentine Ministry of Defense in 1977. The term island is appropriate and replaces "islote" (islet) in the name approved by Advisory Committee on Antarctic Names (US-ACAN) in 1993.

See also 
 List of Antarctic and sub-Antarctic islands

Islands of the Joinville Island group